ESPN Deportes Radio was an American Spanish language sports radio network created and produced by Disney-owned ESPN. Programming included call-in talk shows and commentary from hosts about a full range of sporting events, including soccer, American football, baseball and boxing.

The network had stations in 15 states in the United States (Arizona, California, Florida, Idaho, Illinois, Maryland, Nevada, Oklahoma, New Hampshire, New Jersey, New Mexico, Oregon, Tennessee, Texas and Washington). It was also available terrestrially in Puerto Rico and in northern Mexico (by spillover radio signals) and was available nationally in the US on Sirius XM Radio on Channel 149.

The network shut down on September 8, 2019.

Programming
ESPN Deportes Radio featured sports news and talk in Spanish, with a special emphasis on soccer. Popular personalities on the network included Jorge Ramos, Fernando Alvarez, Hernan Pereyra, José del Valle, Kenneth Garay, Rafael Ramos Villagrana, Elmer Polanco, Armando Talavera Broderick Zerpa, Giovanni Scavia, Jairo Moncada, Noe Vazquez, Diego Cora, Miguel Mannella, Dairon Esmoriz, Humberto Carrera, José Francisco Rivera, Oscar Restrepo, Alberto "Mono" Gambetta, David Lopez, Miguel Angel Cebreros, Dionisio Estrada, Bernardo Pilatti, Guillermo Celis, Renato Bermudez, Alvaro Riet, Omar Orlando Salazar, David Faitelson, Carlos Arratia and Luis Escobar.

ESPN Deportes as well as its English counterpart ESPN Radio were retained by Disney in the sale of ABC Radio to Citadel Broadcasting, then to Cumulus Media. The network was flagshipped at WMYM in Miami, Florida, which was not owned by Disney (it sold the station, then a Radio Disney outlet, in 2015) but had been operated by Disney for several years before that.

Discontinuation of service
On June 11, 2019, ESPN announced that it would be discontinuing the ESPN Deportes Radio network on September 8, 2019, citing consumer habits within the demographic skewing towards digital platforms, the lack of a cohesive sports culture among the United States' various Spanish-speaking communities, and the cost, expense and complications of running a full-time radio network. ESPN plans to convert some of the network's programming to podcasts. 10 full-time employees and 25 part-time employees would be laid off as a result of the closures.

Most stations became affiliates of rival Spanish-language sports network TUDN Radio and the newly launched Unanimo Deportes radio network (which is run by ESPN Deportes alumnus Lino García and also based at WMYM), while WEPN in New York City switched to the national English-language ESPN Radio feed, and the remaining affiliates switched to different formats or went dark.

Event broadcasts

 Soccer

 UEFA Champions League
 UEFA Europa League
 UEFA Super Cup
 Major League Soccer (Viernes de Fútbol, Soccer Sunday, playoffs and MLS Cup)
 CONCACAF Champions League
 International Champions Cup
 CONMEBOL FIFA World Cup Qualifiers
 CONCACAF FIFA World Cup Qualifiers
 FIFA World Cup European Qualifiers
 Premier League
 La Liga
 FA Cup
 Copa del Rey
 Supercopa de España

 Other

 National Basketball Association
 College Football Playoff
 Major League Baseball (Sunday Night Baseball, Major League Baseball All-Star Game, postseason and World Series)
 World Baseball Classic

References

 ESPN Deportes lands its own ‘Dream Job’ - Mary Sutter, Variety, 18 May 2005
 ESPN Deportes Radio to Air 24/7 This Fall - Katy Bachman, Ad Week, 19 May 2005
 ESPN, MRN bringing Spanish-language NASCAR to radio - Michael Smith, Sports Business Journal, 30 October 2006
 ESPN Deportes Radio gets started - Radio and Television Business Report, 20 May 2008

External links

ESPN Deportes Radio
ESPN Deportes Live 
ESPN Deportes Radio on Sirius
ESPN Deportes Radio affiliate stations
ESPN Radio Celebrates its 25th Anniversary with Special Broadcast and Yearlong Programming - Tara Chozet, ESPN Media Zone, 21 December 2016

Deportes Radio
Sirius XM Radio channels
Sports radio networks in the United States
Spanish radio networks
ABC Radio Networks
Radio stations established in 2005
Radio stations disestablished in 2019
Defunct radio networks in the United States
Former subsidiaries of The Walt Disney Company
Defunct radio stations in the United States